Jay Warn is an English actor. He was born in Leytonstone, London, and went on to attend the Italia Conti Academy of Theatre Arts in Clapham from 2011–2014, majoring in acting. He has worked at the Open Door Theatre, the Bridewell Theatre, and the Albany Theatre. He is also an alumnus of the National Youth Theatre of Great Britain.

References

External links
http://www.spotlight.com
https://actors.mandy.com/uk/actor/profile/jay-warn
http://www.jaywarn.biz
http://www.newhamrecorder.co.uk/news/budding_east_ham_actor_defeats_lisp_to_win_a_drama_school_place_1_983618
http://www.newvic.ac.uk/progs/perfarts.htm

Living people
Year of birth missing (living people)
National Youth Theatre members
English male stage actors